Margaret Abela (born 14 March 1949) is the wife of the 8th President of the Republic of Malta, George Abela and hence served as First Lady of Malta during his tenure.

Education
She started her elementary education with the Franciscan nuns at the Pilar School in Valletta, she completed her primary education at St. Elmo Primary School and her secondary education at Maria Assunta Secondary and Technical School in Ħamrun.

Early life
On completing her studies, she worked on a full-time basis in the administration department of the Old University of Malta in Valletta, and later on at Tal-Qroqq, Msida.

After she got married, she carried out administrative work at the Abela Advocates law firm run by her husband and subsequently also by her son, Robert Abela.

Personal life
She married George Abela on 23 May 1976 and had two children, Robert and Maria. Robert Abela was sworn in as the 14th Prime Minister of Malta on 13 January 2020.

Interests and social contributions
For years, she was socially involved in the Tarxien Parish community, where she used to give catechism lessons to children preparing for their First Holy Communion.

Honours

Foreign honours
  : Recipient First Class of the Order of the Cross of Terra Mariana (31.05.2012, serie 989 - n° 98)

See also
President of Malta

References

1949 births
Living people
Spouses of presidents of Malta
People from Valletta

Recipients of the Order of the Cross of Terra Mariana, 1st Class
Grand Crosses of the Order of the Star of Romania